Zsigmond Kisfaludi Strobl (1 July 1884 –  14 August 1975) was a Hungarian sculptor and artist. His sculptural style integrated elements of realism and academism style mainly engaged in creating portrait busts.

External links
Biography and works by Zsigmond Kisfaludi Strobl

Hungarian sculptors
1884 births
1975 deaths
20th-century sculptors